The Vienna Gasometers are four gasholder houses, built as part of the municipal gas works in Vienna, Austria, from 1896 to 1899. They are located in the 11th district, Simmering. They were used from 1899 to 1984 to house gas holders, also known as gasometers, each of 90,000 m³ (3 million cu. ft.) storage capacity. After the changeover from town gas to natural gas between 1969 and 1978, they were no longer used and were shut down. Only the brick exterior walls were preserved.  The structures have found new residential and commercial use in modern times.

History
The Gasometers were built from 1896 to 1899 in the Simmering district of Vienna near the Gaswerk Simmering gas works of the district. The containers were used to help supply Vienna with town gas, facilities which had previously been provided by the English firm Inter Continental Gas Association (ICGA). Once the contracts with the ICGA expired, the city decided to construct facilities to handle its own gas needs. At the time, the design was the largest in all of Europe.

The Gasometers were retired in 1984 due to new technologies in gasometer construction, as well as the city's conversion from town gas and coal gas to natural gas. Gas can be stored underground or in modern high-pressure gas storage spheres under much higher pressures and in smaller volumes than the relatively large gasometers. In 1978, they were designated as protected historic landmarks.

Gasometer B was featured in the 1987 James Bond film The Living Daylights. In the scene, General Koskov arrives inside the building after escaping from Bratislava in a gas pipeline capsule, then is escorted to the top of the building, where he is flown away in a Harrier VTOL jet.

Vienna undertook a remodelling and revitalization of the protected monuments and in 1995 called for ideas for the new use of the structures. The chosen designs by the architects Jean Nouvel (Gasometer A), Coop Himmelblau (Gasometer B), Manfred Wehdorn (Gasometer C) and Wilhelm Holzbauer (Gasometer D) were completed between 1999 and 2001. Each gasometer was divided into several zones for living (apartments in the top), working (offices in the middle floors) and entertainment and shopping (shopping malls in the ground floors). The shopping mall levels in each gasometer are connected to the others by skybridges. The historic exterior wall was conserved. One of the ideas rejected for the project was the plan by architect Manfred Wehdorn to use the Gasometers for hotels and facilities for the planned World Expo in Vienna and Budapest.

On 30 October 2001, the mayor attended the official grand opening of the Gasometers, although people had begun moving in as early as May 2001.

Technical details

The four Gasometers structures each held a cylindrical telescopic gas holder, each with a volume of about 90,000 m³ (3 million cu. ft.) seated in a water basin, each enclosed by a red-brick facade. The Gasometers were gutted during the remodelling and only the brick exterior and parts of the roof were left standing.

Coal gas was dry-distilled from coal and was stored in these containers before it was distributed into the city gas network. The "town gas" was originally used only by the street lamps, but in 1910, its use for cooking and heating in private homes was introduced.

Today
Indoor facilities include a music hall (capacity 2000–3000 people), movie theatre, student dormitory, municipal archive, and so on. There are about 800 apartments (two thirds within the historic brick walls) with 1600 regular tenants, as well as about 70 student apartments with 250 students in residence.

References

External links

Gasometer City - The Shopping Center (German)
Gasometer Vienna
Satellite picture by Google Maps
Gasometer Community
Verein der Freunde der Wiener Gasometer (German, Vienna Gasometer internet community)

Coop Himmelblau
Buildings and structures in Simmering (Vienna)
Music venues in Austria
Cultural venues in Vienna
Shopping malls in Austria
Tourist attractions in Vienna
Residential buildings in Vienna
Gas holders